The 2016–17 UMKC Kangaroos men's basketball team represented the University of Missouri–Kansas City during the 2016–17 NCAA Division I men's basketball season. The Kangaroos, led by fourth-year head coach Kareem Richardson, played their home games at the Municipal Auditorium as members of the Western Athletic Conference.  They finished the season 18–17, 8–6 in WAC play to finish in fourth place. They defeated Texas–Rio Grande Valley in the quarterfinals of the WAC tournament before losing to New Mexico State in the semifinals. They received an invitation to the College Basketball Invitational where they defeated Green Bay in the first round before losing to Wyoming in the quarterfinals.

Previous season
The Kangaroos finished the 2015–16 season 12–19, 4–10 in WAC play to finish in a tie for sixth place. They defeated Utah Valley in the quarterfinals of the WAC tournament before losing to New Mexico State in the semifinals.

Departures

Incoming transfers

2016 incoming recruits

2017 incoming recruits

Roster

Schedule and results

|-
!colspan=9 style=| Exhibition

|-
!colspan=9 style=| Regular season

|-
!colspan=9 style=| WAC tournament

|-
!colspan=9 style=| CBI

References

Kansas City Roos men's basketball seasons
UMKC
UMKC
UMKC Kanga
UMKC Kanga